Glynn Russell Turman (born January 31, 1947) is an American actor, writer, director, and producer. Turman is known for his roles as Lew Miles on the prime-time soap opera Peyton Place (1968–1969), high school student Leroy "Preach" Jackson in the 1975 coming-of-age film Cooley High, math professor and retired Army colonel Bradford Taylor on the NBC sitcom A Different World (1988–1993), and Baltimore mayor Clarence Royce on the HBO drama series The Wire. He received the Primetime Emmy Award for Outstanding Guest Actor in a Drama Series for his role on the HBO drama series In Treatment.

Turman also portrayed Jeremiah Kaan on the Showtime series House of Lies, Doctor Senator in the fourth season of the FX black comedy crime drama series Fargo, and starred in the 2020 Netflix film Ma Rainey's Black Bottom.
The Devil You Know Film 2022

Early life
Turman was born in New York City. According to a DNA analysis, Turman shares maternal ancestry with the Edo people of Nigeria. Turman studied at High School of Performing Arts located in the Manhattan section of New York City, graduating in 1965.

Career
Turman had his first prominent acting role at the age of 12 as Travis Younger in the original Broadway production of Lorraine Hansberry's classic play, A Raisin in the Sun, opposite Sidney Poitier, Ruby Dee, Claudia McNeil, Ivan Dixon, Louis Gossett Jr., Lonne Elder III, John Fiedler and Diana Sands. After graduating high school, he apprenticed in regional and repertory companies throughout the US, including Tyrone Guthrie's Repertory Theatre, in which he performed in late 1960s productions of Good Boys, Harper's Ferry, The Visit, and The House of Atreus. He made his Los Angeles stage debut in William Hanley’s Slow Dance on the Killing Ground. A 1974 performance in The Wine Sellers earned him a Los Angeles Critics Award nomination and a Dramalogue Award. The play was also produced on Broadway as What The Wine Sellers Buy.

Turman won his first NAACP Image Award for his work in the play Eyes of the American. He received his second NAACP Image award for directing Deadwood Dick at the Inner City Cultural Center in Los Angeles.

On television, he has directed episodes of The Parent 'Hood, Hangin' with Mr. Cooper, A Different World, and The Wayans Bros.

Turman began his film career in the 1970s with blaxploitation flicks including Five on the Black Hand Side (1973), Thomasine & Bushrod (1974) and Together Brothers (1974), then progressed to roles in Cooley High (1975), plus The River Niger (1976), J. D.'s Revenge (1976) and A Hero Ain't Nothin' but a Sandwich (1978). TV movies included Carter's Army, the prestigious Centennial, Attica, and Minstrel Man, for which he won his third NAACP Image Award.

Turman appeared in TV movies Race to Freedom: The Underground Railroad in 1994, Buffalo Soldiers, and Freedom Song. More notable films include Penitentiary II (1982), Gremlins (1984), Deep Cover (1992), How Stella Got Her Groove Back (1998), Men of Honor (2000), Sahara (2005), Kings of the Evening (2007), Burlesque (2010) and Super 8 (2011). In 2004, he joined the HBO series The Wire portraying the recurring role of Mayor Clarence Royce, becoming a full-time regular in 2006. His portrayal of Mayor Royce earned him an NAACP Image Award nomination for Outstanding Supporting Actor in a Drama Series in 2007.

Since The Wire, Turman guest-starred as a patient in the Scrubs episode "My Last Words". Turman's other television appearances include Hawaii Five-O (as Harley Dartson, 1973, "Tricks Are Not Treats"), the Twilight Zone segment "Paladin of the Lost Hour" (co-starring Danny Kaye with a script by Harlan Ellison), Matlock, Millennium, and the sitcom All of Us. In 2008, he won a Primetime Emmy award for his guest appearance on the HBO series In Treatment. He appeared in the ABC series Detroit 1-8-7. He has performed and produced a one-man show, Movin' Man, about his life.

Turman auditioned for the role of Han Solo in Star Wars. In a 2007 interview, Turman recalled: "That was in George Lucas' book. Apparently George Lucas had me in mind for the role, and then thought that there might be too much controversy between a white Princess Leia and a black Han Solo – because those were the times – and he didn't want to get into that. At the time, I had no idea. I just went to the audition, did it and got out of there." In 2012, he began appearing in House of Lies on Showtime as the father of the characters played by Don Cheadle and Larenz Tate. In 2016, he appeared in the Oprah Winfrey Network TV show Queen Sugar in which he played the father, Ernest Bordelon.

In 2017, Turman was cast as Nate Lahey Sr. in 10 episodes in seasons 4 and 5 of the ABC drama How to Get Away With Murder. His character is the imprisoned father of Nate Lahey (Billy Brown), a former police officer, detective and lover to series star Annalise Keating (Viola Davis). In 2018, Turman appeared on the legal drama Suits as Vic.

Turman recently appeared in the ABC limited series Women of the Movement in 2021, playing Mose Wright, Emmett Till's great-uncle. Truman also makes a memorable cameo appearance as Mickey in 80 for Brady opposite Rita Moreno, Lily Tomlin, Jane Fonda and Sally Field.

Personal life

Turman has been married three times and has four children. Turman was married to Ula M. Walker from 1965 until 1971. Together, Turman and Walker had three children. Turman married singer Aretha Franklin on April 11, 1978, at her father's (C. L. Franklin) New Bethel Baptist Church in Detroit, Michigan. Turman and Franklin separated in 1982 and divorced in 1984. Turman married Jo-Ann Allen in 1992. Turman and Allen have one daughter.

Filmography

Film

Television

Awards and nominations

References

External links

 
 
 
 

1947 births
20th-century African-American people
20th-century American male actors
21st-century African-American people
21st-century American male actors
African-American male actors
African-American television directors
African-American male child actors
American male television writers
American male child actors
American male film actors
American people of Nigerian descent
American soap opera writers
American male stage actors
American male television actors
American television directors
Living people
Male actors from New York City
People from New York (state)
Primetime Emmy Award winners
Screenwriters from New York (state)